Kalpana Devi (born 9 August 1969) is an Indian politician, elected member from the Ladpura constituency of Rajasthan. She is a member of the 15th Legislative Assembly of Rajasthan. and belongs to the Bharatiya Janata Party.

Political career
Kalpana Devi started her career in the 2018 Ladpura Assembly Elections, winning by 104912 (52.80%) votes.

References

1969 births
Living people
Bharatiya Janata Party politicians from Rajasthan
Rajasthani people
Rajasthani politicians